Hugh Moore may refer to:

Hugh Moore (businessman) (1887–1972), founder of the Dixie Cup Company
Hugh Moore (police officer) (1929–1993), former commander of the City of London Police
Hugh H. Moore (1844–?), New York politician